Renmin Road Subdistrict  is a subdistrict situated in Xunyang District, Jiujiang, Jiangxi, China. , it administers Changhong Village and the following 19 residential neighborhoods:
Renmin Road Community
Shanchuanling Community
Taoyuan Community
Shazidun Community
Xiangyangzha Community
Xincun Community
Xingfuli Community
Xindongfang Community
Lunan Community
Huposhan Community
Laomadu Community
Yaojiawa Community
Dashuxia Community
Hubin Community
Huangtuling Community
Gongdianju Community
Liangmudi Community
Dehua Community
Sunjialong Community

See also
List of township-level divisions of Jiangxi

References

Township-level divisions of Jiangxi
Jiujiang
Subdistricts of the People's Republic of China